Churchill and the Generals is a 1979 BBC television drama concerning the relationship between Winston Churchill and generals of the Allied forces, set in the Cabinet Office and War Rooms between 1940 and 1945. It was written by Ian Curteis (with Peter Young as military advisor).

It was first broadcast on BBC 2 on 23 September 1979, and repeated on BBC 1 on 22 August 1981. It screened on 5 March 1981 in the United States.

The Times television critic Michael Ratcliffe wrote: 'Churchill, though trivial, was intermittently moving and fun (alternative title: Punch in the Second World War?)'

Timothy West won the John Logie Baird performance award (1980). He reprised the role of Churchill in The Last Bastion (1984) and Hiroshima (1995).

Cast

 Timothy West - Winston Churchill
 Eric Porter - Gen. Sir Alan Brooke
 Arthur Hill - Franklin D. Roosevelt
 Joseph Cotten - George C. Marshall
 Richard Dysart - Dwight D. Eisenhower
 Ian Richardson - Bernard L. Montgomery
 Patrick Allen - Claude Auchinleck
 Alexander Knox - Henry Stimson, Secretary of War
 Robert Arden - Harry Hopkins
 Paul Hardwick - Hastings Ismay
 Peter Copley - Sir John Dill
 Patrick Magee - Sir Archibald Wavell
 Terence Alexander - Sir Harold Alexander
 Lyndon Brook - King George VI
 Amanda Walker - Queen Elizabeth
 Richard Easton - Anthony Eden
 Geoffrey Keen - Sir Charles Wilson, 1st Baron Moran
 Bernard Archard - Edward, Lord Halifax
 Edward Jewesbury - Neville Chamberlain
 Barry Jackson - Clement Attlee
 Jacques Duby - Paul Reynaud
 André Maranne - Gen. Maurice Gamelin
 Jacques Boudet - Brig. Gen. Charles De Gaulle
 Noel Coleman - Gen. Sir Edmund Ironside
 Noel Johnson - Adm. Sir Bertram Ramsay
 Robert Raglan - Gen. Maitland Wilson

References

External links

1979 television plays
BBC television dramas
Films about Winston Churchill
Films directed by Alan Gibson
World War II television series
Cultural depictions of George VI
Cultural depictions of Winston Churchill
Cultural depictions of Charles de Gaulle
Cultural depictions of Erwin Rommel
Cultural depictions of Bernard Montgomery
Cultural depictions of Dwight D. Eisenhower
Cultural depictions of Neville Chamberlain